The 2022–23 Seattle Redhawks men's basketball team represented Seattle University in the 2022–23 NCAA Division I men's basketball season. The Redhawks, led by second-year head coach Chris Victor, played their home games at the Redhawk Center and the Climate Pledge Arena as members of the Western Athletic Conference.

Previous season
The Redhawks finished the 2021–22 season 23–9, 14–4 in WAC play to finish as WAC regular season co-champions, alongside New Mexico State and Stephen F. Austin. As the No. 2 seed, they were upset by No. 6 seed Abilene Christian in the semifinals of the WAC tournament.

Roster

Schedule and results

|-
!colspan=12 style=| Non-conference regular season

|-
!colspan=12 style=| WAC regular season

|-
!colspan=9 style=|WAC tournament

Sources

References

Seattle Redhawks men's basketball seasons
Seattle Redhawks
Seattle Redhawks
Seattle